Glenn Holm (born 9 March 1969) is a retired Norwegian football striker.

Hailing from Son, Holm was drafted into Moss FK's senior team from their junior team in 1988. Following unusually good performances in the pre-season friendly matches, he was capped once for Norway in April 1988. At the time he had never played any senior match. Holm featured in over half the games for reigning league champions Moss, but failed to score any league goals. Already in 1989 he went to Fredrikstad FK further down the football pyramid. Struggling with injuries in 1991, he signed for Soon IF after the season. Ahead of the 1995 season he went from Soon to SK Sprint-Jeløy, only to return to Soon in 1996.

References

1969 births
Living people
Norwegian footballers
People from Vestby
Moss FK players
Fredrikstad FK players
SK Sprint-Jeløy players
Eliteserien players
Association football forwards
Norway under-21 international footballers
Norway international footballers
Sportspeople from Viken (county)